Bluegrass Album, Vol. 3 — California Connection is a third album by bluegrass supergroup, Bluegrass Album Band, released in 1983. Dobroist Jerry Douglas is added to the line-up and the band includes some more country-rock to the mix, but the most part of the album consists of classics by Bill Monroe, Lester Flatt and Earl Scruggs.

Track listing 
 "Devil In Disguise" (Chris Hillman, Gram Parsons) 3:20
 "Letter From My Darling" (Bill Monroe) 3:00
 "A Hundred Years From Now" (Lester Flatt) 2:15
 "Unfaithful One" (Sid Campbell) 2:56
 "Down The Road" (Lester Flatt, Earl Scruggs) 2:15
 "I'd Rather Be Alone" (Lester Flatt) 3:07
 "Big Spike Hammer" (Pete Goble, Bobby Osborne) 3:00
 "Please Search Your Heart" (Pete Goble, Doyle Lawson) 2:29
 "Hey Lonesome" (Sam Humphrey, Jimmy Martin) 2:05
 "I'm Waiting To Hear You Call Me Darlin'" (Lester Flatt) 2:33
 "Wall Around Your Heart" (Don Reno, Red Smiley, Buddy Smith) 2:42
 "Come Back Darling" (Lester Flatt) 2:25

Personnel 
 Tony Rice - guitar, vocals
 J.D. Crowe - banjo, vocals
 Doyle Lawson - mandolin, vocals
 Bobby Hicks - fiddle
 Jerry Douglas - Dobro, vocals
 Todd Philips - bass

References 

1983 albums
Rounder Records albums